PR domain zinc finger protein 2 is a protein that in humans is encoded by the PRDM2 gene.

Function 

This tumor suppressor gene is a member of a nuclear histone/protein methyltransferase superfamily. It encodes a zinc finger protein that can bind to retinoblastoma protein, estrogen receptor, and the TPA-responsive element (MTE) of the heme-oxygenase-1 gene. Although the functions of this protein have not been fully characterized, it may (1) play a role in transcriptional regulation during neuronal differentiation and pathogenesis of retinoblastoma, (2) act as a transcriptional activator of the heme-oxygenase-1 gene, and (3) be a specific effector of estrogen action. Three transcript variants encoding different isoforms have been found for this gene.

Interactions 

PRDM2 has been shown to interact with Estrogen receptor alpha and Retinoblastoma protein.

References

Further reading

External links 
 

Transcription factors